Wong Kar Gee (born 18 March 1991) is a Malaysian paralympic athlete. He represented Malaysia at the 2020 Summer Paralympics.

References

External links 
 

Paralympic athletes of Malaysia
Living people
1991 births
People from Sabah
Malaysian people of Chinese descent
Malaysian male long jumpers
Track and field athletes with disabilities
Athletes (track and field) at the 2020 Summer Paralympics